"’Alā Khallidī" was the national anthem of Tunisia from 1958 to 1987. It was used during the Presidency of Habib Bourguiba until his downfall in 1987. Humat al-Hima was temporarily a national anthem between the end of the monarchy on 25 July 1957 and the adoption of Ala Khallidi as the official national anthem. In 1958, the Ministry of Education organized a competition, in which 53 poets and 23 musicians took part. The results were examined first by a commission of the Board of Education, which selected the submissions of the hymn poet Jalaleddine Naccache (1910–1989) and the composer and director of the Conservatoire of Tunis Salah El Mahdi (1925-2014). The works were presented to the president without announcing the selection that already been made. He selected the same version as the commission had. To be completely sure, officials held another larger popular assembly in Monastir, the birth city of the president, where all 23 melodies were played. The song by Naccache and El Mahdi won, and the nation formally adopted it on 20 March, Tunisia's Independence Day, that year.

Humat al-Hima replaced Ala Khallidi following the coup which brought Zine El Abidine Ben Ali to power on 7 November 1987.

Lyrics 

African anthems
Historical national anthems
Tunisian culture